Richard L. Morningstar (born 1945) is the former United States Ambassador to Azerbaijan. He was formerly Special Envoy of the United States Secretary of State for Eurasian Energy. Currently, Ambassador Morningstar is the founding director and chairman of the Global Energy Center at the Atlantic Council. He also serves as a senior advisor at Albright Stonebridge Group, a global business strategy firm.

Education
Richard Morningstar earned a Bachelor of Arts, magna cum laude, from Harvard College and a Juris Doctor from Stanford Law School in 1970.

Career
Morningstar started his career with the law firm of Peabody & Brown (now Nixon Peabody) in Boston, Massachusetts, where he practiced law from 1970 to 1981.  He then served as CEO of Costar Corporation, and since 1990 as the chairman of the board.  Since June 1993, Morningstar served as senior vice president for Policy and Investment Development at the Overseas Private Investment Corporation.  In April 1995,  Morningstar was posted as the special advisor to the president and Secretary of State on Assistance to the New Independent States of the Former Soviet Union. His rank of ambassador was confirmed by the Senate on 11 June 1996.  In July 1998, he was assigned as a special advisor to the president and the Secretary of State for Caspian Basin Energy Diplomacy.  In that capacity Morningstar was a promoter of the Baku–Tbilisi–Ceyhan pipeline.  In 1999–2001, Morningstar served as the United States Ambassador to the European Union.

Beginning in 2001, Ambassador Morningstar served as a senior director at the global strategy firm Stonebridge International (now Albright Stonebridge Group)

On 20 April 2009, Ambassador Morningstar was named to the position of the Special Envoy of the United States Secretary of State for Eurasian Energy. In that capacity Morningstar represented the United States at the signing ceremony of the intergovernmental agreement of the Nabucco pipeline.  He has strongly opposed the possible participation of Iran in the Nabucco project.

Morningstar has been a visiting scholar and diplomat in residence at the Stanford University Institute for International Studies, a lecturer in law at Stanford Law School and an adjunct professor at Harvard University's John F. Kennedy School of Government.

On 27 April 2012, Morningstar was nominated for the US Ambassadorship in Azerbaijan.  On 30 June 2012, the U.S. Senate confirmed this appointment.

In 2014 Morningstar was named director of the Atlantic Council’s New Global Energy Center.

Personal life
Richard Morningstar is married to Faith Pierce Morningstar, a former board member of the democracy promotion and human rights group Freedom House, with two sons and two daughters. He also has 12 grandchildren.

References

External links

Living people
1945 births
Harvard College alumni
Stanford Law School alumni
People associated with energy
Ambassadors of the United States to the European Union
Ambassadors of the United States to Azerbaijan
United States Special Envoys
20th-century American diplomats
21st-century American diplomats